Melville Bertram Couvelier (January 20, 1931 – May 30, 2011) was a businessman and political figure in British Columbia. He represented Saanich and the Islands from 1986 to 1991 in the Legislative Assembly of British Columbia as a Social Credit member.

He was born in Vancouver, British Columbia. In 1948, Couvelier married Milly Quakenbush. He was employed by Crown Zellerbach, a paper manufacturing company, then went on to operate a general store in Coal Harbour. In 1960, the family moved to Victoria. There, he became the owner of Maplewood Poultry Processors and later established Couvelier's Fine Apparel. He was mayor of Saanich from 1977 to 1986.

In 1986, he ran for the leadership of the Social Credit Party; he placed 11th out of 12 candidates on the first ballot, and withdrew, endorsing eventual winner Bill Vander Zalm. Couvelier then ran in the 1986 election for the riding of Saanich and the Islands, and was elected. He was subsequently named to Vander Zalm's cabinet as minister of finance. He remained in the post until March 6, 1991, when he quit because he "couldn't sit beside" Vander Zalm while the latter was under investigation for conflict-of-interest. After Vander Zalm's resignation and replacement by Rita Johnston, he was re-appointed minister of finance on April 8, 1991.

One month later, on May 7, Couvelier was removed from cabinet. He was alleged to have breached the confidentially provisions of the Financial Institutions Act, leading Johnston to request his resignation. Couvelier complied, but was publicly defiant: denying the allegations, requesting Johnston release the review that persuaded her to fire him, and challenging her to "lay a charge, so I can defend myself in court." Couvelier had obtained his own legal advice that argued his innocence, and said he had a "suspicion of what drives this", which reporters took as a reference to leadership ambitions.

He ran for the party leadership once more in 1991. Placing a distant third behind frontrunners Rita Johnston and Grace McCarthy, Couvelier became a "queenmaker". Despite previous animosity with Johnston, he backed her over McCarthy, leading to Johnston's victory.

In 2008, Couvelier was unsuccessful in a bid to become mayor of Sidney, British Columbia. He died in Saanich at the age of 80.

References 

1931 births
2011 deaths
British Columbia municipal councillors
British Columbia Social Credit Party MLAs
Businesspeople from Vancouver
Finance ministers of British Columbia
Mayors of places in British Columbia
Members of the Executive Council of British Columbia
Politicians from Vancouver